In rail transport, a wheel arrangement or wheel configuration is a system of classifying the way in which wheels are distributed under a locomotive. Several notations exist to describe the wheel assemblies of a locomotive by type, position, and connections, with the adopted notations varying by country.  Within a given country, different notations may also be employed for different kinds of locomotives, such as steam, electric, and diesel powered.

Especially in steam days, wheel arrangement was an important attribute of a locomotive because there were many different types of layout adopted, each wheel being optimised for a different use (often with only some being actually "driven"). Modern diesel and electric locomotives are much more uniform, usually with all axles driven.

Major notation schemes

The main notations are the Whyte notation (based on counting the wheels), the AAR wheel arrangement notation (based on counting either the axles or the bogies), and the UIC classification of locomotive axle arrangements (based on counting either the axles or the bogies).

Whyte notation is generally used for steam locomotives throughout the United States, Canada, the United Kingdom and Ireland. For diesels and electrics, North America uses the AAR wheel arrangement scheme while British practice uses a slightly simplified form of the European UIC classification scheme (except for small diesel shunters, where Whyte notation is used).

In mainland Europe, the UIC classification scheme is generally used for all locomotive types including steam, with some exceptions. In France, the UIC classification is used for diesels and electrics while a scheme similar to the Whyte notation, but counting axles instead of wheels, is used for steam locomotives. Notably, Switzerland had its own separate notation system until 1989, with the Swiss locomotive and railcar classification now only retained for its narrow gauge railways.

AAR wheel arrangement  -  Used largely throughout the US and Canada for diesel and electric locomotives.
UIC classification  -  Used in mainland Europe for all locomotive types. Used in the UK for electric and large diesel locomotives.
Whyte notation  -  Used in North America, the UK and Ireland for steam locomotives, and for shunters (US: switchers) in the UK.

Comparison of wheel arrangements and wheel picture 

{| class="wikitable sortable"
|-class="background6"
!VDEV/VMEV/UIC-System
!Whyte-Notation
!American name
!Picture schemeLocomotive front is to the left
|-
|A1
|0-2-2
|
|Oo
|-
|A2
|0-2-4
|
|Ooo
|-
|1A
|2-2-0
|Planet
|oO
|-
|1A1
|2-2-2
|Patentee
|oOo
|-
|1A2
|2-2-4
|
|oOoo
|-
|2′A
|4-2-0
|Crampton, Norris, Jervis
|ooO
|-
|2′A1
|4-2-2
|Single Driver
|ooOo
|-
|2A2
|4-2-4
|
|ooOoo
|-
|3A
|6-2-0
|Crampton
|oooO
|-
|N/A
|0-3-0
|
|OOO
|-
|B
|0-4-0
|Four-Wheel-Switcher
|OO
|-
|B1
|0-4-2
|
|OOo
|-
|B2′
|0-4-4
|Forney
|OOoo
|-
|B3′
|0-4-6
|
|OOooo
|-
|1B
|2-4-0
|Hanscom
|oOO
|-
|1′B1′
|2-4-2
|Columbia
|oOOo
|-
|1B2′
|2-4-4
|
|oOOoo
|-
|1B3′
|2-4-6
|
|oOOooo
|-
|2′B
|4-4-0
|American, Eight-Wheeler
|ooOO
|-
|2′B1′
|4-4-2
|Atlantic
|ooOOo
|-
|2′B2′
|4-4-4
|Jubilee (CA), Reading (US)
|ooOOoo
|-
|2′B3′
|4-4-6
|
|ooOOooo
|-
|C
|0-6-0
|Six-Wheel-Switcher
|OOO
|-
|C1
|0-6-2
|
|OOOo
|-
|C2′
|0-6-4
|
|OOOoo
|-
|1′C
|2-6-0
|Mogul
|oOOO
|-
|1′C1′
|2-6-2
|Prairie
|oOOOo
|-
|1′C2′
|2-6-4
|Adriatic
|oOOOoo
|-
|1′C3′
|2-6-6
|
|oOOOooo
|-
|2′C
|4-6-0
|Ten-Wheeler
|ooOOO
|-
|2′C1′
|4-6-2
|Pacific
|ooOOOo
|-
|2′C2′
|4-6-4
|Hudson, Baltic
|ooOOOoo
|-
|D
|0-8-0
|Eight-Wheel-Switcher
|OOOO
|-
|D1
|0-8-2
|
|OOOOo
|-
|D2′
|0-8-4
|
|OOOOoo
|-
|D3′
|0-8-6
|
|OOOOooo
|-
|1′D
|2-8-0
|Consolidation
|oOOOO
|-
|1′D1′
|2-8-2
|Mikado
|oOOOOo
|-
|1′D1′
|2-8-2T
|MacArthur
|oOOOOo
|-
|(1′D1′)(1′D1′)
|2-8-2+2-8-2
|Double Mikado, Garratt
|oOOOOo+oOOOOo
|-
|1′D2′
|2-8-4
|Berkshire
|oOOOOoo
|-
|1′D3′
|2-8-6
|
|oOOOOooo
|-
|2′D
|4-8-0
|Twelve-Wheeler, Mastodon
|ooOOOO
|-
|2′D1′
|4-8-2
|Mountain, Mohawk (NYC)
|ooOOOOo
|-
|2′D2′
|4-8-4
|Northern, General Service (SP), Golden State (SP), Niagara (NYC), Wyoming
|ooOOOOoo
|-
|2D3
|4-8-6
|
|ooOOOOooo
|-
|3′D3′
|6-8-6
|Turbine (Pennsylvania Railroad Steam Turbine)
|oooOOOOooo
|-
|E
|0-10-0
|Ten-Wheel Switcher
|OOOOO
|-
|E1′
|0-10-2
|Union
|OOOOOo
|-
|1′E
|2-10-0
|Decapod
|oOOOOO
|-
|2′E
|4-10-0
|Mastodon
|ooOOOOO
|-
|1′E1′
|2-10-2
|Santa Fe
|oOOOOOo
|-
|1′E2′
|2-10-4
|Texas, Selkirk (Canadian Pacific)
|oOOOOOoo
|-
|2′E1′
|4-10-2
|Southern Pacific, Overland
|ooOOOOOo
|-
|F
|0-12-0
|Pennsylvania, Twelve-Wheel-Switcher
|OOOOOO
|-
|1′F
|2-12-0
|Centipede
|oOOOOOO
|-
|1′F1′
|2-12-2
|Javanic
|oOOOOOOo
|-
|2′F1′
|4-12-2
|Union Pacific
|ooOOOOOOo
|-
|2′G2′
|4-14-4
|
|ooOOOOOOOoo
|-
|Soviet (AA)
|0-2-2-0
|
|O O
|-
|B′B
|0-4-4-0
|nameless (Mallet)
|OO OO
|-
|B′B1
|0-4-4-2
|nameless (Mallet)
|OO OOo
|-
|2′BB2′
|4-4-4-4
|nameless (Pennsylvania Railroad Duplex)
|ooOO OOoo
|-
|3′BB3′
|6-4-4-6
|
|oooOO OOooo
|-
|2′CB2′
|4-6-4-4
|nameless (Pennsylvania Railroad Duplex)
|ooOOO OOoo
|-
|C′C
|0-6-6-0
|Erie  (Mallet)
|OOO OOO
|-
|(1′C)C
|2-6-6-0
|Denver (Mallet)
|oOOO OOO
|-
|(1′C)C1′
|2-6-6-2
|Mallet Mogul (SP), Prairie Mallet (ATSF), Chesapeake
|oOOO OOOo
|-
|(1′C)C2′
|2-6-6-4
|nameless (Simple articulated)
|oOOO OOOoo
|-
|(2′C)C2′
|4-6-6-4
|Challenger (Simple articulated)
|ooOOO OOOoo
|-
|(1′C)C3′
|2-6-6-6
|Allegheny, Blue Ridge (Mallet/Simple articulated)
|oOOO OOOooo
|-
|D′D
|0-8-8-0
|Angus (Mallet)
|OOOO OOOO
|-
|(1′D)D
|2-8-8-0
|Bullmoose (Mallet)
|oOOOO OOOO
|-
|(1′D)D1′
|2-8-8-2
|Chesapeake, Mallet consolidation (Mallet)
|oOOOO OOOOo
|-
|(1′D)D2′
|2-8-8-4
|Yellowstone  (Mallet/Simple articulated)
|oOOOO OOOOoo
|-
|(2′D)D1′
|4-8-8-2
|Cab Forward (Simple articulated)
|ooOOOO OOOOo
|-
|(2′D)D2′
|4-8-8-4
|Big Boy (Simple articulated)
|ooOOOO OOOOoo
|-
|(1′E)E1′
|2-10-10-2
|Virginian (Mallet)
|oOOOOO+OOOOOo
|-
|(2′C1′)(1′C2′)
|4-6-2+2-6-4
|Double Pacific (Garratt)
|ooOOOo+oOOOoo
|-
|(2′C2′)(2′C2′)
|4-6-4+4-6-4
|Double Hudson (Garratt)
|ooOOOoo+ooOOOoo
|-
|(2′D)(D2′)
|4-8-0+0-8-4
|Double Mastodon (Garratt)
|ooOOOO+OOOOoo
|-
|(2′D1′)(1′D2′)
|4-8-2+2-8-4
|Double Mountain (Garratt)
|ooOOOOo+oOOOOoo
|-
|(2′D2′)(2′D2′)
|4-8-4+4-8-4
|Double Northern (Garratt)
|ooOOOOoo+ooOOOOoo
|}

See also 

 Co-Co locomotives

References

Locomotives